The Mauritania Islamic Air Force ( or FAIM) is the air force of the Armed Forces of Mauritania. It was established in 1960. Like many of the former French colonies, Mauritania received limited economic and military aid from France. The FAIM started out as a French-operated transport force, and has seen combat against the Polisario Front in the 1970s.

History

Beginnings
The Mauritania Islamic Air Force came into being shortly after the country's independence, in 1960. At that time, it was named the Aviation Group of the Islamic Republic of Mauritania. Its first aircraft were one Douglas C-47 and several Max Holste MH.1521 Broussards, all donated by France and operating from the airfield at Nouakchott. All of the newly created air force's personnel was French. Five additional C-47s and three Broussards were bought in the following years. In 1966, the air force was officially re-designated as the Mauritania Islamic Air Force ( or FAIM for short). The purchase of six SOCATA Rallyes allowed for the training of native pilots to begin in 1970.

Thanks to the influx of newly trained native pilots and ground personnel, the FAIM grew significantly in the early 1970s. A 1971 reorganisation saw the creation of a transport squadron (operating C-47s) and a liaison squadron (operating the Broussards and seven second-hand Reims-Cessna Skymasters. Two Douglas C-54s were bought in 1974, and two Short Skyvan 3Ms followed the next year. In 1976, four Reims-Cessna FTB337Gs and four Britten-Norman Defenders were acquired, and formed a surveillance squadron. Both of these types could be armed with gun and rocket pods. Over the years, a total of nine Defenders were bought. Subsequently, negotiations for the purchase of FMA IA 58 Pucarás were initiated with Argentina. A contract was almost concluded, but the acquisition process was stopped due to financial considerations. However, four de Havilland Canada DHC-5 Buffalos were bought in 1978. As of 1976, the FAIM numbered less than 150 personnel.

War with the Polisario Front
In 1976, the Polisario Front started to attack Mauritanian territory. Flying activity by the FAIM was intense, and in June, the second-ever foray of the Polisario in Mauritania, in the direction of the capital Nouakchott, was detected by FAIM aircraft while still underway towards its target. The Polisario convoy, comprising about 100 vehicles, thus had to retreat prematurely. Moreover, FAIM BN-2 Defenders repeatedly harassed the convoy while it was driving towards the Algerian border. However, these aircraft were vulnerable to ground fire, and on 29 December a Defender was shot down by a 9K32 Strela-2 MANPADS, with the whole crew being killed. Another followed on 16 July 1977, with one killed; the two survivors evaded capture from the Polisario. A third Defender was downed by a Strela-2 on 10 January 1978, with its pilot being killed. In early February of the same year, Defenders helped evacuate dozens of wounded soldiers from the army garrison of Tichlé, which had withstood a Polisario attack.

The war against the Polisario Front was a huge strain on the Mauritanian national budget, and it caused more and more discontent in the country, including inside of its armed forces. Two successful military coups took place in 1978 and 1979 respectively. While the war with the Polisario continued, on 27 May 1979 the junta's strongman Ahmed Ould Bouceif died in the crash of the FAIM DHC-5D that was bringing him to an ECOWAS summit in Dakar, together with the other 11 occupants. The new Mauritanian government then decided to stop the country's involvement in Western Sahara, and a peace treaty between Mauritania and the Polisario Front was signed in August.

From the 1980s to today
The Air Force School was recently created in Atar. It was founded to train pilots, mechanics, other crewmen for the Air Force.

More recent procurements have been from China in the form of the Harbin Y-12 II turboprop transports were delivered in September 1995, one crashed in April 1996.  A second one crashed on July 12, 2012. The Xian Y-7 (a licensed variant of the An-24) was delivered from October 1997, which crashed in May 1998.

Aircraft

See also
List of air forces

References

Notes

Bibliography

External links 

Air forces by country
Air force
Military aviation in Africa